Samuel Klingenstierna (18 August 1698 – 26 October 1765) was a very renowned Swedish mathematician and scientist. He started his career as a lawyer but soon moved to natural philosophy. Already as a student he gave lectures on the then novel mathematical analysis of Newton and Leibniz. Klingenstierna was professor of geometry in Uppsala University from 1728. In 1750 he moved to physics but retired two years later to become an advisor to the Commander of Artillery. In 1756 he assumed the post of the tutor of the Crown Prince, the future king Gustav III.

He was the first to enunciate errors in Newton's theories of refraction, geometrical notes that were used by John Dollond in his experiments.  Later on he was instrumental in the invention of the Achromatic Telescope. Klingenstierna published in Sweden and in Swedish, and his priority was not recognized.

References
 Lars Gårding: Matematik och Matematiker. 1996. Lund University Press.
 "Klingenstierna, Samuel." Complete Dictionary of Scientific Biography. 2008. Charles Scribner's Sons. Encyclopedia.com. 21 Jan. 2010.

1698 births
1765 deaths
Swedish nobility
Academic staff of Uppsala University
Members of the Royal Swedish Academy of Sciences
Fellows of the Royal Society
18th-century Swedish mathematicians